Johannes Cornelis "Joop" van Nellen (15 March 1910 – 14 November 1992) was a Dutch football forward who played for Netherlands in the 1934 FIFA World Cup. He also played for DHC Delft.

References

External links
 FIFA profile

1910 births
1992 deaths
Dutch footballers
Netherlands international footballers
Association football forwards
1934 FIFA World Cup players
Footballers from Delft